Versteeg is a Dutch toponymic surname. It is a contraction of "van der steeg", meaning "from the alley/path". De Steeg has also been the name of a number of farms and  localities. Variations on this name include Versteegen, Versteegh, Versteegt, Verstege, Verstegen and Versteghe. People with these names include:

Versteeg
Bryan Versteeg (born c.1975), Canadian conceptual artist
Dave Versteeg (born 1976), Dutch short track speed skater and coach
 (1876-1943), Dutch physician and explorer
Gerrit Versteeg (1872-1938), Dutch architect
Gerrit Versteeg (born 1958), Dutch enterprise architect
Heinz Versteeg (1939–2009), Dutch football striker
Kelly Versteeg (born 1994), Dutch tennis player
Kris Versteeg (born 1986), Canadian ice hockey winger
Marcel Versteeg (born 1965), Dutch long-distance runner
Marlon Versteeg (born 1997), Dutch football forward
Menno Versteeg, Canadian indie rock singer
Mitch Versteeg (born 1988), Canadian ice hockey defenceman
Versteegde
Antoon Versteegde (born 1953), Dutch bamboo artist
Versteegen
Niek Versteegen (born 1994), Dutch football forward
Versteegh
Kees Versteegh (born 1947), Dutch orientalist and linguist
Frank Versteegh (born 1954), Dutch air racer
Pierre Versteegh (1888–1942), Dutch horse rider
 (1886–1975), First Royal Netherlands Air Force pilot
Versteegt
Hans Versteegt (1928–2011), Dutch organ builder
Mandy Versteegt (born 1990), Dutch football forward
Verstegen
Lyda Verstegen (born 1930s), Dutch lawyer and activist
Mark Verstegen (born 1969), American businessman
Mike Verstegen (born 1971), American football player
Richard Verstegen (ca.1550-1640), Anglo-Dutch antiquary, poet, and polemic
Sanne Verstegen (born 1985), Dutch middle-distance runner 
Ute Verstegen (born 1970), German archaeologist
Willem Verstegen (1612–1659), Dutch explorer and merchant; chief trader of the factory in Dejima

References

Dutch-language surnames
Surnames of Dutch origin
Toponymic surnames